Siltronic AG is a manufacturer of wafers made of hyperpure silicon, the basis for modern micro- and nanotechnology. The Munich-based company is one of the world's leading manufacturers of wafers for the semiconductor industry.

History
The company was founded in 1968 as Wacker-Chemitronic Gesellschaft für Elektronik-Grundstoffe mbH ("Wacker-Chemitronic") in Burghausen and changed its name to Wacker Siltronic GmbH in 1994. The company was renamed as a stock corporation (Wacker Siltronic AG) in 1996. In 2004, the company changed its name to Siltronic AG.

The company manufactures silicon wafers with diameters of up to 300 mm at its two German production sites in Burghausen and Freiberg, as well as at sites in Asia and the USA. The company is a member of the Silicon Saxony association/industry association.

In 2020, it was announced that Siltronic would be sold to Taiwanese manufacturer GlobalWafers, a subsidiary of Sino-American Silicon Products (SAS), for a good 3.7 billion euros. The offer was increased to around 4.4 billion euros in 2021. According to the two companies, the merger would create a leading supplier to the wafer industry with a comprehensive product portfolio and the ability to offer technologically advanced products to all semiconductor customers. Siltronic AG is in advanced discussions, nearing completion, regarding a takeover offer from GlobalWafers. But the deal did not receive regulatory approval on time. GlobalWafers already acquired SunEdison's semiconductor business in 2016.

Share and shareholder structure
The company's shares have been traded in the Prime Standard of the Frankfurt Stock Exchange since June 11, 2015, and were admitted to the TecDAX on December 21 of the same year. Prior to that, Siltronic was a wholly owned subsidiary of Wacker Chemie. Between September 24, 2018 and June 21, 2021, Siltronic was additionally listed in the MDAX, and since then in the SDAX.

The company's share capital is divided into 30 million no-par value shares. A share of 30.83%, which has been held by Wacker Chemie since March 2017, is considered a fixed ownership. The remaining 69.17% are considered free float. As of November 2021, the free float shareholders subject to reporting requirements include Sino-American Silicon Products Inc. (13.67%), Goldman Sachs (7.88%), and JP Morgan Chase (6.50%) are the largest shareholders.

Production sites
 Burghausen, Germany
 Freiberg, Germany
 Portland, United States
 Singapore, Singapore

Products
Siltronic AG sells silicon wafers with diameters from 200 mm to 300 mm (4 to 12 inches) with many different features such as:
 Crystal growth according to Czochralski method or Float Zone method
 Polished, epitaxial, as cut, lapped, etched surface
 Silicon wafers are offered with boron, phosphorus, antimony and arsenic doping.

Siltronic AG and Samsung Electronic of South Korea are partners in a joint venture to produce 300mm (12 inch) wafers in a factory in Singapore.

References

External links
 Siltronic

Manufacturing companies based in Munich
Silicon wafer producers
German companies established in 1968
Manufacturing companies established in 1968
Companies in the TecDAX
Companies in the MDAX